Neoechinorhynchidae is a family of parasitic worms from the order Neoechinorhynchida.

Species
Neoechinorhynchidae contains 4 subfamilies: Atactorhynchinae Petrochenko, 1956, Eocollinae Petrochenko, 1956, Gracilisentinae Petrochenko, 1956, Neoechinorhynchinae Ward, 1917.

Mayarhynchus
The genus Mayarhynchus Pinacho-Pinacho, Hernández-Orts, Sereno-Uribe, Pérez-Ponce de León & García-Varela, 2017 is different from the other 17 genera in Neoechinorhynchidae by having a small proboscis. It has nine longitudinal rows of five hooks each, totaling 45 to 46 relatively weak rooted hooks.
Mayarhynchus karlae Pinacho-Pinacho, Hernández-Orts, Sereno-Uribe, Pérez-Ponce de León & García-Varela, 2017
M. karlae has a small proboscis with nine longitudinal rows of five hooks each, totaling 45 to 46 relatively weak rooted hooks and a proboscis receptacle is nearly cylindrical and contains a single layered wall. The worm has a short trunk with a body wall containing five dorsal and one ventral giant hypodermal nuclei. The lemnisci are broad and flat with large nuclei. In the male, the testes are in tandem, and the cement gland has eight large nuclei. In the female, the eggs are oval. Phylogenetic analysis has been conducted based on the cox1 gene, and the 28S ribosomal RNA gene were conducted to compare with other species of Neoechinorhynchidae, confirming its correct family, however it determined that Neoechynorhynchus is not monophyletic.

Atactorhynchinae Petrochenko, 1956
Atactorhynchus Chandler, 1935
 Atactorhynchus duranguensis Salgado-Maldonado, Aguilar-Aguilar and Cabañas-Carranza, 2005
A. duranguensis has been found in the intestine of the Mezquital pupfish (Cyprinodon meeki) a fish from in-land Mexico. Diagnostic features include: body small, stout, ventrally curved; small cylindrical proboscis armed with 16 alternating vertical rows of four or five hooks; anterior two or three hooks conspicuous, stout and larger than other hooks, and have large, rod-shaped roots with a markedly and abruptly enlarged base; three posterior hooks of each row are smaller and rootless; single-walled proboscis receptacle; lemnisci equal in length, elongate and robust; and cement gland syncytial, larger than testis. The new species is smaller than A. verecundus with smaller hook lengths and slightly smaller proboscis. A. duranguensis is also shaped differently: it has a proboscis shape that is not widest at the apex, and the greatest width of the trunk is in about the middle contrasting A. verecundus where the trunk is widest posteriorly, and the proportion of large apical proboscis hooks in relation to the small basal hooks is different: the basal hooks of A. verecundus are about half the size of the anterior hooks and but only about a quarter of the size in A. duranguensis. Unlike A. verecundus, the base of the roots are markedly and abruptly enlarged in the new species. Finally, the eggs of the new species are smaller (23-27 x 8-10 um) than those of A. verecundus (27-30 x 12-13 um).

 Atactorhynchus verecundus Chandler, 1935
Floridosentis
 Floridosentis mugilis (Machado-Filho, 1951)
 Floridosentis pacifica Bravo-Hollis, 1969
Tanaorhamphus
 Tanaorhamphus longirostris (Van Cleave, 1913)

Eocollinae Petrochenko, 1956
Eocollis Van Cleve, 1947
Eocollis arcanus Van Cleve, 1947
Eocollis catostomi Buckner, 1992
Eocollis harengulae Wang, 1981

Gracilisentinae Petrochenko, 1956
Gracilisentis Van Cleave, 1919
 Gracilisentis gracilisentis (Van Cleave, 1913)
 Gracilisentis mugilis Gupta and Lata, 1967
 Gracilisentis sharmai (Gupta and Lata, 1967)
 Gracilisentis variabilis (Diesing, 1856)
Pandosentis Van Cleve, 1920
 Pandosentis iracundus Van Cleve, 1920
 Pandosentis napoensis Smales, 2007
Wolffhugelia Mane-Garzon and Dei-Cas, 1974
 Wolffhugelia matercula Mane-Garzon and Dei-Cas, 1974

Neoechinorhynchinae Ward, 1917
 Dispiron Bilqees, 1970
 Dispiron catlai Khan and Bilqees, 1987
 Dispiron heteroacanthus Khan and Bilqees, 1985	
 Dispiron mugili Bilqees, 1970
 Gorytocephalus Nickol and Thatcher, 1971
 Gorytocephalus elongorchis Thatcher, 1979
 Gorytocephalus plecostomorum Nickol and Thatcher, 1971
 Gorytocephalus spectabilis (Machado-Filho, 1959)
 Gorytocephalus talaensis Vizcaino and Lunaschi, 1988
 Hexaspiron Dollfus and Golvan, 1956
 Hexaspiron nigericum Dollfus and Golvan, 1956
 Hexaspiron spinibarbi Yu and Wang, 1977
 Microsentis Martin and Multani, 1966
 Microsentis wardae Martin and Multani, 1966
 Neoechinorhynchus Stiles and Hassall, 1905
 Neoechinorhynchus afghanus Moravec and Amin, 1978
 Neoechinorhynchus aldrichettae Edmonds, 1971
 Neoechinorhynchus ampullata Amin, Ha and Ha, 2011
 Neoechinorhynchus argentatus Chandra, Hanumantha-Rao and Shyamasundari, 1984
 Neoechinorhynchus bangoni Tripathi, 1959
 Neoechinorhynchus brayi Bilqees, Shaikh and Khan, 2011
 Neoechinorhynchus cirrhinae Gupta and Jain, 1979
 Neoechinorhynchus coiliae Yamaguti, 1939
 Neoechinorhynchus cyanophyctis Kaw, 1951
 Neoechinorhynchus devdevi (Datta, 1936)
 Neoechinorhynchus glyptosternumi Fotedar and Dhar, 1977
 Neoechinorhynchus hartwichi Golvan, 1994
 Neoechinorhynchus hutchinsoni Datta, 1936
 Neoechinorhynchus ichthyobori Saoud, El-naffar, Abu-sinna, 1974
 Neoechinorhynchus indicus Gudivada, Chikkam and Vankara, 2010
 Neoechinorhynchus karachiensis Bilgees, 1972
 Neoechinorhynchus logilemniscus Yamaguti, 1954
 Neoechinorhynchus magnus Southwell and Macfie, 1925
 Neoechinorhynchus mexicoensis Pinacho-Pinacho, Sereno-Uribe and García-Varela, 2014	
 Neoechinorhynchus nematalosi Tripathi, 1959
 Neoechinorhynchus nigeriensis Farooqi, 1981
 Neoechinorhynchus ningalooensis Pichelin and Cribb, 2001	
 Neoechinorhynchus octonucleatus Tubangui, 1933
 Neoechinorhynchus oreini Fotedar, 1968
 Neoechinorhynchus ovalis Tripathi, 1959
 Neoechinorhynchus personatus Tkach, Sarabeev and Shvetsova, 2014	
 Neoechinorhynchus roonwali Datta and Soota, 1963
 Neoechinorhynchus saginatus Van Cleave and Bangham, 1949
 Neoechinorhynchus simansularis Roytman, 1961
 Neoechinorhynchus topseyi Podder, 1937
 Neoechinorhynchus tsintaoense Morisita, 1937
 Neoechinorhynchus veropesoi Melo, Costa, Giese, Gardner and Santos, 2015	
 Neoechinorhynchus yamagutii Tkach, Sarabeev and Shvetsova, 2014
 Neoechinorhynchus zacconis Yamaguti, 1935
 Hebesoma Van Cleave, 1928	 
 Neoechinorhynchus agilis (Rudolphi, 1819)
 Neoechinorhynchus anguillum El-Damarany, 2001
 Neoechinorhynchus carinatus Buckner and Buckner, 1993
 Neoechinorhynchus chrysemydis Cable and Hopp, 1954
 Neoechinorhynchus didelphis Amin, 2001
 Neoechinorhynchus doryphorus Van Cleqve and Bangham, 1949
 Neoechinorhynchus idahoensis Amin and Heckmann, 1992
 Neoechinorhynchus kallarensis George and Nadakal, 1978
 Neoechinorhynchus lingulatus Nickol and Ernst, 1987
 Neoechinorhynchus manasbalensis Kaw, 1951
 Neoechinorhynchus manubrianus Amin, Ha and Ha, 2011
 Neoechinorhynchus pungitius Dechtiar, 1971
 Neoechinorhynchus rostratus Amin and Bullock, 1998
 Neoechinorhynchus spiramuscularis Amin, Heckmann and Ha, 2014	
 Neoechinorhynchus violentus (Van Cleave, 1928)	
 Neoechinorhynchus Hamann, 1892
 Neoechinorhynchus acanthuri Farooqi, 1980
 Neoechinorhynchus africanus Troncy, 1970
 Neoechinorhynchus armenicus Mikailov, 1975
 Neoechinorhynchus ascus Amin, Ha and Ha, 2011	
 Neoechinorhynchus australis Van Cleave, 1931
 Neoechinorhynchus brentnickoli Monks, Pulido-Flores and Violante-Gonzalez, 2011	
 Neoechinorhynchus buttnerae Golvan, 1956
 Neoechinorhynchus carassii Roytmann, 1961
 Neoechinorhynchus carpiodi Dechtiar, 1968
 Neoechinorhynchus chelonos Schmidt, Esch, and Gibbons, 1970
 Neoechinorhynchus chilkaense Podder, 1937
 Neoechinorhynchus chimalapasensis Salgado-Maldonado, 2010
 Neoechinorhynchus crassus Van Cleave, 1919
 Neoechinorhynchus cristatus Lynch, 1936
 Neoechinorhynchus curemai Noronha, 1973
 Neoechinorhynchus cylindratus (Van Cleave, 1913)
 Neoechinorhynchus dattai Golvan, 1994
 Neoechinorhynchus dimorphospinus Amin and Sey, 1996
 Neoechinorhynchus distractus Van Cleave, 1949
 Neoechinorhynchus dorsovaginatus Amin and Christison, 2005
 Neoechinorhynchus edmondsi Golvan, 1994
 Neoechinorhynchus emydis (Leidy, 1851)
 Neoechinorhynchus emyditoides Fisher, 1960
 Neoechinorhynchus formosanus Harada, 1938
 Neoechinorhynchus gibsoni Khan and Bilqees, 1989
 Neoechinorhynchus golvani Salgado-maldonado, 197
 Neoechinorhynchus iraqensis Amin, Al-Sady, Mhaisen and Bassat, 2001	
 Neoechinorhynchus johnii Yamaguti, 1939
 Neoechinorhynchus limi Muzzall and Buckner, 1982
 Neoechinorhynchus macronucleatus Machado, 1954
 Neoechinorhynchus magnapapillatus Johnson, 1969
 Neoechinorhynchus mamesi Pinacho-Pinacho, Pérez-Ponce de León and García-Varela, 2012
 Neoechinorhynchus moleri Barger, 2005
 Neoechinorhynchus nawazi Naqvil, Aly Khan, Ghazi and Noor-un-Nissa, 2012
 Neoechinorhynchus nickoli Khan, Bilqees, Noor-Un-Nisa, Ghazi and Ata-Ur-Rahim, 1999
 Neoechinorhynchus notemigoni Dechtiar, 1967
 Neoechinorhynchus panucensis Salgado-Maldonado, 2013
 Neoechinorhynchus paraguayensis Machado-Filho, 1959
 Neoechinorhynchus pimelodi de Carvalho and Cezar-Pavanelli, 1998
 Neoechinorhynchus plagiognathoptis Wang and Zhang, 1987
 Neoechinorhynchus plaquensis Amin, Ha and Ha, 2011
 Neoechinorhynchus prochilodorum Nickol and Thatcher, 1971
 Neoechinorhynchus prolixoides Bullock, 1963
 Neoechinorhynchus prolixus Van Cleave and Timmons, 1952
 Neoechinorhynchus pseudemydis Cable and Hopp, 1954
 Neoechinorhynchus pterodoridis Thatcher, 1981
 Neoechinorhynchus qatarensis Amin, Saoud and Alkuwari, 2002
 Neoechinorhynchus quinghaiensis Liu, Wang, and Yang, 1981
 Neoechinorhynchus rigidus (Van Cleave, 1928)
 Neoechinorhynchus robertbaueri Amin, 1985
 Neoechinorhynchus roseum Salgado and Maldonado, 1978
 Neoechinorhynchus rutili (Mueller, 1780)
 Neoechinorhynchus salmonis Ching, 1984
 Neoechinorhynchus saurogobi Yu and Wu, 1989
 Neoechinorhynchus schmidti Barger, Thatcher and Nickol, 2004
 Neoechinorhynchus sootai Bhattacharya, 1999
 Neoechinorhynchus strigosus Van Cleave, 1949
 Neoechinorhynchus stunkardi Cable and Fisher, 1961
 Neoechinorhynchus tenellus (Van Cleave, 1913)
 Neoechinorhynchus tumidus Van Cleave and Bangham, 1949
 Neoechinorhynchus tylosuri Yamaguti, 1939
 Neoechinorhynchus venustus Lynch, 1936
 Neoechinorhynchus villoldoi Vizcaino, 1992
 Neoechinorhynchus wuyiensis Wang, 1981
 Neoechinorhynchus zabensis Amin, Abdullah and Mhaisen, 2003
 Neoechinorhynchus yalei (Datta, 1936)
 Octospinifer Van Cleave, 1919
 Octospinifer macilentus Van Cleave, 1919
 Octospinifer rohitaii Zuberi and Farooqi, 1976
 Octospinifer torosus Van Cleave and Haderlie, 1950
 Octospinifer variabilis (Deising, 1851)
 Octospiniferoides Bullock, 1957
 Octospiniferoides australis Schmidt and Hugghins, 1973
 Octospiniferoides chandleri Bullock, 1957
 Octospiniferoides incognita Schmidt and Hugghins, 1973
 Paraechinorhynchus Bilqees and Khan, 1983
 Paraechinorhynchus kalriai Bilqees and Khan, 1983
 Paulisentis Van Cleave and Bangham, 1949
 Paulisentis fractus Van Cleave and Bangham, 1949
 Paulisentis missouriensis Keppner, 1974
 Zeylonechinorhynchus Fernando and Furtado, 1963
 Zeylonechinorhynchus longinuchalis Fernando and Furtado, 1963

Hosts

Neoechinorhynchidae species parasitize fish.

Notes

References

 
Neoechinorhynchida
Acanthocephala families